Linderud is a station on Grorud Line of the Oslo Metro located between Vollebekk and Veitvet in Norway. The station is located in the Bjerke borough. Linderud is a residential area, with several tall apartment buildings.

References

External links

Oslo Metro stations in Oslo
Railway stations opened in 1966
1966 establishments in Norway